The Lady's Museum was a monthly magazine published in the United Kingdom between 1760 and 1761. 

The magazine was edited and largely—if not entirely—written by British novelist and translator Charlotte Lennox. Like most eighteenth-century periodicals, The Lady’s Museum presented itself as a means of educating and informing its readers. In this, it resembles an earlier women’s periodical, The Female Spectator (1744-6), by Eliza Haywood.

See also
 List of 18th-century British periodicals
 List of 18th-century British periodicals for women

External links
The Ladies Museum Project: "the first ever critical edition of The Lady’s Museum."

References

Magazines established in 1760
Defunct women's magazines published in the United Kingdom